Democratic Youth is the youth organization of the Democratic Party (DS). The current chairperson of the Democratic Youth is Stefan Ninić.

It was formed on 12 May 1990. It is an organization of young members of DS up to 30 years old.

Membership

In 2011, the Democratic Party had over 40,000 members younger than 30. Every member of the DS who is younger than 30 years old, may become a member of the Democratic Youth.

References

External links
 Official homepage of Democratic Youth 
 Rules of Procedure of Democratic Youth 

Political organizations based in Serbia
Youth wings of social democratic parties